Wintersberg can refer to:

 Wintersberg (Spessart), hill in Hesse, Germany
 Grand Wintersberg, hill in the North Vosges, Alsace, France
 Wintersberg, village in Wunsiedel, Germany
 Wintersberg, village in Aegidienberg, Bad Honnef, Germany

See also
 Winterberg (disambiguation)
 Wintersbourg
 Wintersburg, Arizona